With the Tides is the second studio album by English rock band South, originally released on Kinetic Records in 2003. It peaked at number 21 on the UK Independent Albums Chart.

Track listing

Personnel
Credits adapted from liner notes.

South
 Joel Cadbury
 Jamie McDonald
 Brett Shaw

Additional musicians
 Dave Eringa – synthesizer, mellotron, organ
 Shaun Genocky – guitar, whistle
 Will Harper – Rhodes piano, bass guitar
 Sally Herbert – string arrangement, violin
 Jules Singleton – violin
 Dinah Beamish – cello
 Claire Orsler – viola
 Skaila Kanga – harp

Technical personnel
 Dave Eringa – production, mixing
 Shaun Genocky – co-production, mixing, engineering
 Howie Weinberg – mastering
 Dbox – art direction
 Laure Hughes – photography

Charts

References

External links
 

2003 albums
South (band) albums
Kinetic Records albums